Mooroopna North West is a small town in Victoria, Australia. It is located in the City of Greater Shepparton.

References

Towns in Victoria (Australia)
City of Greater Shepparton